Rebecca Sharp is a thoroughbred racehorse. She was owned by Anthony Oppenheimer, trained by Geoff Wragg and won the 1997 G1 Royal Ascot Coronation Stakes under jockey Michael Hills. The win was a major upset, as Rebecca Sharp had 25-1 odds of winning over the favorite Sleepytime.

References

1994 racehorse births
Racehorses bred in the United Kingdom
Racehorses trained in the United Kingdom
Thoroughbred family 9-c